Sympistis min is a moth of the family Noctuidae first described by James T. Troubridge in 2008. It is found in the US state of Colorado.

The wingspan is about 26 mm.

References

min
Moths described in 2008